FYVE, RhoGEF and PH domain containing (FGD) is a gene family consisting of:

 FGD1
 FGD2
 FGD3
 FGD4

Type 1 is associated with Aarskog-Scott syndrome.

See also 
 Guanine nucleotide exchange factor

References

External links 
 
 

Gene families